Pietro Ingrao (30 March 1915 – 27 September 2015) was an Italian politician and journalist who participated in the resistance movement. 
For many years he was a senior figure in the Italian Communist Party (PCI).

Political career
Ingrao was born at Lenola, in the province of Latina.

As a student he was a member of GUF (Gruppo Universitario Fascista) and won a "Littoriale" of culture and art.

Ingrao joined the PCI in 1940 and took part in the anti-fascist resistance during World War II. After the war, he led the Marxist-Leninist tendency in the party, representing its left wing. This led him to frequent political differences with Giorgio Amendola, leader of the social democratic tendency.

Ingrao was a Member of Parliament continuously from 1950 to 1992. In 1947–1957, he was editor-in-chief of the party newspaper, L'Unità. He was the first Communist to become President of the Italian Chamber of Deputies, a position he held from 1976 to 1979.

After PCI's then-secretary Achille Occhetto, in what was called the Svolta della Bolognina, decided to change the party's name, Ingrao become his main internal opponent. In the PCI's 20th  Congress of 1991, he joined the reformist majority in its successor, the Democratic Party of the Left (PDS), but soon left the group. After the European elections of 2004, he  abandoned PDS and adhered (as an independent) to the more hardline successor to the old PCI, the Communist Refoundation Party.

He has written a number of poems and political essays. His most important work is Appuntamenti di fine secolo ("Rendez-vous at the end of the century"), published in 1995 in collaboration with Rossana Rossanda.

Ingrao was an atheist. He married , who died in 2003. Ingrao died on September 27, 2015 at the age of 100.

Electoral history

References

Sources

External links

1915 births
2015 deaths
People from the Province of Latina
Italian atheists
Italian Communist Party politicians
Democratic Party of the Left politicians
Communist Refoundation Party politicians
Left Ecology Freedom politicians
Presidents of the Chamber of Deputies (Italy)
Deputies of Legislature I of Italy
Deputies of Legislature II of Italy
Deputies of Legislature III of Italy
Deputies of Legislature IV of Italy
Deputies of Legislature V of Italy
Deputies of Legislature VI of Italy
Deputies of Legislature VII of Italy
Deputies of Legislature VIII of Italy
Deputies of Legislature IX of Italy
Deputies of Legislature X of Italy
Politicians of Lazio
Italian journalists
Italian male journalists
Italian resistance movement members
Italian centenarians
Men centenarians
L'Unità editors